These are the official results of the Women's 200 metres event at the 2001 IAAF World Championships in Edmonton, Canada.

Medalists

Results

Heats
First 4 of each Heat (Q) and the next 4 fastest (q) qualified for the semifinals.

Semifinals
First 2 of each Heat (Q) and the next 2 fastest (q) qualified for the final.

Final

References
 Finals Results
 Semi-finals results
 Heats results

Events at the 2001 World Championships in Athletics
200 metres at the World Athletics Championships
2001 in women's athletics